Mark Gregory Duggan (born November 13, 1970) is the Wayne and Jodi Cooperman Professor of Economics at Stanford University, where he is also the director of the Stanford Institute for Economic Policy Research (SIEPR).

Education and career
Duggan received his B.S. and M.S. in electrical engineering from the Massachusetts Institute of Technology in 1992 and 1994, respectively. He went on to receive his Ph.D. in economics from Harvard University in 1999, whereupon he joined the University of Chicago as an assistant professor of economics. In 2003, he left the University of Chicago to become an associate professor in the University of Maryland's economics department, where he became a full professor in 2007. From 2009 to 2010, he was a senior economist in the Obama administration's Council of Economic Advisers. In 2011, he left the University of Maryland to become a professor in the  Department of Business Economics and Public Policy at the Wharton School of the University of Pennsylvania, where he was named the Rowan Family Foundation Professor in 2012. In 2014, he left the Wharton School to become The Wayne and Jodi Cooperman Professor of Economics at Stanford, as well as a senior fellow of SIEPR there in the same year. In September 2015, he became the director of SIEPR.

Research
While at the University of Chicago, Duggan worked with Steven Levitt to study whether sumo wrestling matches in Japan were rigged, and  published multiple studies on the relationship between gun ownership and rates of homicide and suicide. His research on gun ownership has found that it was positively related to the homicide rate, and that looser concealed carry laws do not reduce crime. More recently, he has published studies linking disability benefits programs, such as Social Security Disability Insurance and Supplemental Security Income, to high rates of unemployment.

Personal life
Duggan is married, with two children.

References

External links
Stanford faculty page
SIEPR faculty page

Living people
1970 births
21st-century American economists
Stanford University faculty
Harvard Graduate School of Arts and Sciences alumni
University of Chicago faculty
University of Maryland, College Park faculty
Wharton School of the University of Pennsylvania faculty
MIT School of Engineering alumni